Raymond Charles Corley (January 1, 1928 – February 5, 2007) was an American professional basketball player. Corley was selected in the fifth round of the 1949 BAA Draft by the Providence Steamrollers after a collegiate career at Georgetown. He played for the Syracuse Nationals, Baltimore Bullets, Tri-Cities Blackhawks and Fort Wayne Pistons in his three-season NBA career. Ray is sometimes listed as the brother of fellow basketball player Ken Corley, but they were from different families, with Ken being from Oklahoma and Ray from New York City.

Career statistics

NBA
Source

Regular season

Playoffs

References

External links
 Georgetown Basketball History: The Top 100 → 73. Ray Corley

1928 births
2007 deaths
American Basketball League (1925–1955) players
American men's basketball players
Baltimore Bullets (1944–1954) players
Basketball players from New York City
Fort Wayne Pistons players
Georgetown Hoyas men's basketball players
Guards (basketball)
Notre Dame Fighting Irish men's basketball players
Providence Steamrollers draft picks
St. Peter's Boys High School alumni
Syracuse Nationals players
Tri-Cities Blackhawks players
Utica Pros players
Wilkes-Barre Barons players